Kayaralam is one of the villages in Mayyil Gram panchayat in the Kannur District, state of Kerala, India.

Demographics
As of 2011 Census, Kayaralam had a population of 17,159 with 8,042 males (46.9%) and 9,117 females (53.1%). The average male female sex ratio was 1,134 higher than state average of 1,084. In Kayaralam, 11.75% of the population was under 6 years age. Kayaralam had overall literacy of 94.1% higher than state average of 94%.

Administration
Before the formation of the Mayyil panchayath, it was a panchayath. Orappadi is the nearest town.

Transportation
The national highway passes through Valapattanam town.  Goa and Mumbai can be accessed on the northern side and Cochin and Thiruvananthapuram can be accessed on the southern side.  The road to the east of Iritty connects to Mysore and Bangalore.   The nearest railway station is Kannur on Mangalore-Palakkad line. 
Trains are available to almost all parts of India subject to advance booking over the internet.  There are airports at Mattanur, Mangalore and Calicut. All of them are international airports but direct flights are available only to Middle Eastern countries.

References 

Villages near Mayyil